Dengiz is a Turkish surname. Notable people with this name include:
Berna Dengiz, Turkish industrial engineer
 (1929–1983), Turkish politician
Özgür Dengiz (born 1984), Turkish murderer
Rachel Dengiz, American filmmaker and musician, member of Bush Tetras spinoff band Command V

See also
Dengiz Beg Rumlu (died 1613), Turkoman courtier and envoy to Spain

Turkish-language surnames